Santiidae is a family of crustaceans belonging to the order Isopoda.

Genera:
 Halacarsantia Wolff, 1989
 Kuphomunna Barnard, 1914
 Prethura Kensley, 1982
 Santia Sivertsen & Holthuis, 1980
 Spinosantia Wolff & Brandt, 2000

References

Isopoda